GSS Institute of Technology (GSSIT), is a private co-educational engineering college  approved by the All India Council of Technical Education affiliated to Visweswaraiah Technological University established in 2004 and managed by H.R Charitable Trust. The campus is located on a hilly , surrounded by a green plantation, on the Byrohalli-Kengeri main road on the southwestern edge of Bangalore City. It is situated in Bangalore in Karnataka state, India. GSSIT is recognized as a Research Centre by Visvesvaraya Technological University (VTU).

GSSIT is a technical institute offering undergraduate and post-graduate programmes in several streams of Engineering, IT and Management. It has over 500 students. The college also supports environmental measures. The main Avenue is flanked on either side by green covers, the irrigation of which is done with waste water of the campus, treated in the water treatment plant. The hot water storage and supply system of the on campus boarding is entirely solar powered. The campus also houses an environmental-friendly cafeteria.
Recently a group of four higher semester students invented, how to increase mileage using water.

Courses and departments

Engineering Departments 
The following departments offer a four-year Bachelor of Engineering (B.E.) course in engineering:
 Department of Civil Engineering
 Department of Computer Science and Engineering
 Department of Electrical and Electronics Engineering
 Department of Electronics and Communication Engineering
 Department of Mechanical Engineering..

Recently with prior approval of AICTE, the institute has increased its annual intake

Admission 

To get admission, students must appear in the examination conducted by the Karnataka state government and the Consortium of Medical, Engineering and Dental Colleges of Karnataka

Student life
Students participate in technical and cultural societies and clubs, to develop their managerial and technical skills.

Robotics club
The club organises robotics events and workshops in techfest and other times, round the year. A final year student is generally selected as a chairperson of the club.

Festivals
Students celebrate technical and cultural festivals held in every even semester of the academic year. "Kalataranga" is the major attraction which held in month of April every year. Many reputed colleges affiliated to university take part in this festival.

Library 
The Central Library serves the needs of students, faculty and staff members. The library has CD-Rom, on-line databases, journals, audio and video cassettes, dissertations and project reports. Senior Faculties and professors are actively involved in writing journals and books.

Controversy
The college has been disaffiliated from VTU.  Ref No. VTU/REG/2014-15/4000 dated 02/08/2014.

Gallery

References

External links

GSSIT website 
Cet Karnataka
VTU Website
Invention

Engineering colleges in Bangalore
Affiliates of Visvesvaraya Technological University
All India Council for Technical Education
Educational institutions established in 2004
2004 establishments in Karnataka